Cutlery (also referred to as silverware, flatware, or tableware), includes any hand implement used in preparing, serving, and especially eating food in Western culture. A person who makes or sells cutlery is called a cutler. The city of Sheffield in England has been famous for the production of cutlery since the 17th century and a train – the Master Cutler – running from Sheffield to London was named after the industry. Bringing affordable cutlery to the masses, stainless steel was developed in Sheffield in the early 20th century. 

The major items of cutlery in Western culture are the knife, fork and spoon. These three implements first appeared together on tables in Britain in the Georgian era. In recent times, hybrid versions of cutlery have been made combining the functionality of different eating implements, including the spork (spoon / fork), spife (spoon / knife), and knork (knife / fork). The sporf or splade combines all three.

Etymology
The word cutler derives from the Middle English word 'cuteler' and this in turn derives from Old French 'coutelier' which comes from 'coutel'; meaning knife (modern French: couteau). The word's early origins can be seen in the Latin word 'culter' (knife).

Composition

Metallic 
Sterling silver is the traditional material from which good quality cutlery is made. Historically, silver had the advantage over other metals of being less chemically reactive. Chemical reactions between certain foods and the cutlery metal can lead to unpleasant tastes. Gold is even less reactive than silver, but the use of gold cutlery was confined to the exceptionally wealthy, such as monarchs.

Steel was always used for more utilitarian knives, and pewter was used for some cheaper items, especially spoons. From the nineteenth century, electroplated nickel silver (EPNS) was used as a cheaper substitute for sterling silver.

In 1913, the British metallurgist Harry Brearley discovered stainless steel by chance, bringing affordable cutlery to the masses. This metal has come to be the predominant one used in cutlery. An alternative is melchior, corrosion-resistant nickel and copper alloy, which can also sometimes contain manganese and nickel-iron.

Plastic 
Plastic cutlery is made for disposable use, and is frequently used outdoors for camping, excursions, and barbecues for instance. Plastic cutlery is also commonly used at fast-food or take-away outlets and provided with airline meals in economy class.
Plastic is also used for children's cutlery. It is often thicker and more durable than disposable plastic cutlery.

Wooden 

Wooden disposable cutlery is available as a popular biodegradable alternative. Bamboo (although not a wood) and maple are popular choices.

Edible 
Edible cutlery is made from dried grains. These are made primarily with rice, millets or wheat. Since rice cultivation needs a lot of water, manufacturers market millet based products as more environment friendly. The batter is baked in moulds which hardens it. Some manufacturers offer an option of flavoured cutlery. Edible cutlery decomposes in about a week if disposed.

Industry

At Sheffield the trade of cutler became divided, with allied trades such as razormaker, awlbladesmith, shearsmith and forkmaker emerging and becoming distinct trades by the 18th century.

Before the mid 19th century when cheap mild steel became available due to new methods of steelmaking, knives (and other edged tools) were made by welding a strip of steel on to the piece of iron that was to be formed into a knife, or sandwiching a strip of steel between two pieces of iron.  This was done because steel was then a much more expensive commodity than iron. Modern blades are sometimes laminated, but for a different reason. Since the hardest steel is brittle, a layer of hard steel may be laid between two layers of a milder, less brittle steel, for a blade that keeps a sharp edge well, and is less likely to break in service.

After fabrication, the knife had to be sharpened, originally on a grindstone, but from the late medieval period in a blade mill or (as they were known in the Sheffield region) a cutlers wheel.

Disposable cutlery

Plastic 

Introduced for convenience purposes (lightweight, no cleanup after the meal required), disposable cutlery made of plastic has become a huge worldwide market. Along with other disposable tableware (paper plates, plastic table covers, disposable cups, paper napkins, etc.), these products have become essential for the fast food and catering industry. The products are emblematic of throw-away societies and the cause of millions of tons of non-biodegradable plastic waste. The European Union has banned such plastic products from 3 July 2021 as part of the European Plastics Strategy. Bans are also planned in the UK and Canada.

Wooden 
As an ecofriendly alternative to non-degradable plastic, wooden cutlery is gaining popularity. Some manufacturers coat their products in food-safe plant oils, waxes and lemon juice for a longer shelf life making these safe for human consumption. Cutlery is then cured for a few days before leaving the manufacturing plant.

Manufacturing centres

Traditional centres of cutlery-making include:
 Caldas das Taipas in Portugal
 Albacete in Spain
 Meriden and Oneida in United States of America
 Premana in Italy
 Sheffield in the United Kingdom
 Solingen in Germany
 Styria in Austria
 Thiers and Laguiole in France
 Toledo in Spain
 Wazirabad in Pakistan
 Galway in Ireland
 Carlos Barbosa in Brazil

See also
 Cutler (disambiguation)
 Eating utensil etiquette
 Steak knife
 Table setting
 Tableware
 List of eating utensils
 List of food preparation utensils
 Sujeo

References

Further reading 
 Hey, D. The Fiery Blades of Hallamshire: Sheffield and Its Neighbourhood, 1660–1740 (Leicester University Press 1991). 193–140.
 Lloyd, G. I. H. The Cutlery Trades: An Historical Essay in the Economics of Small Scale Production. (1913; repr. 1968).

External links

Associazione culturale Coltellinai Forgiatori Bergamaschi – Research laboratory on damascus steel

Food preparation utensils